Michael Solomon Ndawula Senyimba  was an Anglican bishop who served in Uganda: he was the second  Bishop of Mukono, serving from November 1995 to June 2002.

References

20th-century Anglican bishops in Uganda
Uganda Christian University alumni
21st-century Anglican bishops in Uganda
Anglican bishops of Mukono